Alyxoria is a genus of lichen-forming fungi in the family Lecanographaceae.

The genus has a cosmopolitan distribution.

Species
Alyxoria apomelaena 
Alyxoria bicolor 
Alyxoria culmigena 
Alyxoria cyanea  – Brazil
Alyxoria diaphora 
Alyxoria fuscospora  – Brazil
Alyxoria lichenoides 
Alyxoria lutulenta 
Alyxoria mougeotii 
Alyxoria notha 
Alyxoria ochrocheila 
Alyxoria ochrocincta 
Alyxoria sierramadrensis  – Mexico
Alyxoria subelevata 
Alyxoria subrimalis 
Alyxoria varia 
Alyxoria variiformis 
Alyxoria viridipruinosa 
Alyxoria wainioi 
Alyxoria xerica

References

Arthoniomycetes
Lichen genera
Arthoniomycetes genera
Taxa described in 1821